Hesperesta is a moth genus in the family Autostichidae.

Species
 Hesperesta alicantella Derra, 2008
 Hesperesta arabica Gozmány, 2000
 Hesperesta geminella (Chrétien, 1915)
 Hesperesta hartigi (Turati, 1934)
 Hesperesta rhyodes (Meyrick, 1909)

References

 
Holcopogoninae